The name Alvin has been used for four tropical cyclones worldwide, three in the Eastern Pacific Ocean and once in the Southwest Indian Ocean.

In the Eastern Pacific:
 Tropical Storm Alvin (2007), weak tropical storm that did not affect land.
 Tropical Storm Alvin (2013), early season tropical storm that stayed far from land.
 Hurricane Alvin (2019), a category 1 hurricane that did not affect land. 

In the South-West Indian:
 Intense Tropical Cyclone Bertie–Alvin (2005), existed in the Australian region as Severe Tropical Cyclone Bertie before moving into the South-West Indian Ocean basin and being renamed Alvin; did not affect land.

Pacific hurricane set index articles
South-West Indian Ocean cyclone set index articles